Seong, also spelled Song or Sung, is an uncommon Korean family name, a single-syllable Korean given name, as well as a common element in two-syllable Korean given names. The meaning differs based on the hanja used to write it.

Family name
The family name Seong is written with only one hanja, meaning "succeed" or "accomplish". The 2000 South Korean Census found 167,903 people with this family name, up by six percent from 158,385 in the 1985 census. This increase was far smaller than the fifteen percent growth in the overall South Korean population over the same period. They traced their origins to only a single bon-gwan, Changnyeong County. This was also the place where they formed the highest concentration of the local population, with 2,360 people (3.61%).

In a study by the National Institute of the Korean Language based on 2007 application data for South Korean passports, it was found that 67.4% of people with this surname spelled it in Latin letters as Sung in their passports. The Revised Romanisation spelling Seong was in second place at 29.4%. Rarer alternative spellings (the remaining 3.2%) included Seung, Shung, and the Yale Romanisation spelling Seng.

Government and politics
Seong Sam-mun (1418–1456), Joseon Dynasty official
Seong Seung (died 1456), Joseon Dynasty official
Seong Huian (1461–1513), Joseon Dynasty official
Seong Hon (1535–1598), Joseon Dynasty official
Ui-bin Seong (1753–1786), Joseon Dynasty concubine
Sung Jusik (1891–1956), Korean independence activist, later a North Korean politician
Seong Hye-rang (born 1935), North Korean defector
Sung Yun-mo (born 1963), South Korean politician
Sung Jae-gi (1967–2013), South Korean activist

Popular culture
Sung Dong-il (born 1964), South Korean actor
Sung Ji-ru (born 1968), South Korean actor
Sung Hyun-ah (born 1975), South Korean actress
Sung Si-kyung (born 1979), South Korean ballad singer
Sung Yu-ri (born 1981), South Korean pop singer
Sung Yu-bin (born 2000), South Korean actor

Sport
Sung Nak-woon (1923–1986), South Korean football forward
Seong Nak-gun (born 1962), South Korean sprinter
Sung Han-kook (born 1963), South Korean badminton player
Sung Jung-a (born 1965), South Korean basketball player
Sung Kyung-hwa (born 1965), South Korean handball player
Sung Hee-jun (born 1974), South Korean long jumper
Sung Han-soo (born 1976), South Korean football forward (K League 1)
Sung Jong-hyun (born 1979), South Korean football defender (K League 1, China League One)
Sung Kyung-mo (born 1980), South Korean football goalkeeper (K League 1)
Sung Min (swimmer) (born 1982), South Korean swimmer
Sung Hyun-ah (footballer) (born 1982), South Korean football forward
Seong Kyung-il (born 1983), South Korean football goalkeeper (K League 1)
Sung Si-bak (born 1987), South Korean short track speed skater
Seong Se-hyeon (born 1990), South Korean curler
Sung Ji-hyun (born 1991), South Korean badminton player
Sung Eun-ryung (born 1992), South Korean luger
Seong Eun-jeong (born 1999), South Korean professional golfer
Sung Nak-so, South Korean table tennis player

Other
Seong Baek-in (born 1933), South Korean Tungusologist
Dan Keun Sung (born 1952), South Korean electronic engineer
Wonyong Sung (born ), South Korean professor of electronic and information engineering
Jung Mo Sung (born 1957), South Korean-born Brazilian theologian
Doris Sung (born 1964), American educator of Korean descent
Seung-Yong Seong (born 1965), South Korean immunologist
Kiwan Sung (born 1967), South Korean poet
Hugh Sung (born 1968), American classical pianist of Korean descent
Shi-Yeon Sung (born 1975), South Korean classical conductor
Steve Sung (born 1985), South Korean poker player
Mikyung Sung (born 1993), South Korean double bass player
Lea Seong, South Korean fashion designer

Fictional characters
Seong Chun-hyang, the title character of the folk tale Chunhyangjeon
Seong Mi-na, in Japanese fighting game series Soul
Sung Jinwoo, protagonist of the South Korean light novel and manhwa, Solo Leveling
Seong Gi-hun, the main character of the television series Squid Game

In given names

Hanja
, regulations of the Supreme Court of Korea permit the following 24 hanja with the reading Seong, plus six variant forms, to be registered for use in given names.

Ten characters from the table of basic hanja for educational use:

: "family name"
: "character", "personality"
: "accomplish"
 (variant)
: "castle"
 (variant)
: "sincere"
 (variant)
: "abundant"
 (variant)
: "to observe"
: "sage"
: "voice"
: "star"

Fourteen characters from the table of additional hanja for name use:

: name of a kind of jade
: "beautiful"
: "brightness of jade"
: "to realise"
: "to awaken"
: "library"
: "orangutan"
: "reed"
: "rotting meat"
: "property", "valuables"
: "victory"
: "bright"
 (variant)
 (variant)
: "sharp hearing"
: "red horse"

People
People with the monosyllabic given name Seong include:
Seong Gi (died 108 BC), Gojoseon general killed during the Han conquest of Gojoseon
Seong of Baekje (–554), 26th king of Baekje
Seong of Balhae (died 795), 5th ruler of the kingdom of Balhae
Jin Xing (born 1967), Chinese ballet dancer of Korean descent

As name element
Many names starting with this element have been popular names for newborn baby boys in earlier decades, according to South Korean government data:
1940: Sung-ki (9th place)
1950: Sung-soo (3rd place) and Sung-ho (6th place)
1960: Sung-ho (1st place) and Sung-soo (7th place)
1970: Sung-ho (2nd place), Sung-jin (3rd place), Sung-hoon (5th place), and Sung-min (8th place)
1980: Sung-min (2nd place) and Sung-hoon (6th place)
1990: Sung-min (3rd place) and Sung-hyun (4th place)

Other names containing beginning with this element include:

Sung-chul (masculine)
Sung-ha (masculine)
Seong-han (unisex)
Sung-hee (unisex)
Seong-ja (feminine)
Sung-keun (masculine)
Seong-gyeong (unisex)
Sung-mi (feminine)
Sung-nam (masculine)
Sung-sook (feminine)
Sung-woo (masculine)
Sung-yong (masculine)

Other names ending with this element include:

Dae-sung (masculine)
Hae-seong (masculine)
Hee-sung (unisex)
Hye-sung (unisex)
Il-sung (masculine)
Jae-sung (masculine)
Jin-sung (unisex)
Oh-seong (masculine)
Tae-sung (masculine)
Woo-sung (masculine)

See also
List of Korean family names
List of Korean given names

Notes

References

Korean-language surnames